The Royal Titles Act 1876 (39 & 40 Vict., c. 10) was an Act of the Parliament of the United Kingdom which officially recognized Queen Victoria (and subsequent monarchs) as “Empress of India”.

This title had been assumed by her in 1876, under the encouragement of the prime minister Benjamin Disraeli.  The long title of the Act is "An Act to enable Her most Gracious majesty to make an addition to the Royal Style and Titles appertaining to the Imperial Crown of the United Kingdom and its Dependencies." It was repealed by the Indian Independence Act 1947.

References

United Kingdom Acts of Parliament 1876
Style of the British sovereign